Gabriel Swann Macht (born January 22, 1972) is an American actor and film producer. He is known for portraying Harvey Specter in the USA Network series Suits (2011–2019) and the title character in the 2008 superhero film The Spirit.

Early life
Macht was born in The Bronx, New York City, to Jewish parents. He is the son of Suzanne Victoria Pulier, a museum curator and archivist, and actor Stephen Macht. He has three siblings: Jesse, a musician (who appeared on The Next Great American Band), Ari Serbin, and Julie. Macht was raised in California from the age of five. After graduating from Beverly Hills High School, he attended Carnegie Mellon College of Fine Arts, where he graduated in 1994. During his time at Carnegie Mellon, he became a member of Delta Upsilon fraternity.

Career
Macht was nominated for the Best Young Motion Picture Actor Award after playing his first role at age eight in the film Why Would I Lie? under the stage name Gabriel Swann.

He has appeared in many film and television roles including A Love Song for Bobby Long, The Good Shepherd, Because I Said So, The Recruit, and Archangel. For the 2001 film Behind Enemy Lines, Macht spent a week at sea filming on the flight deck, corridors, and hangar bay #3 of the USS Carl Vinson. Macht played the title role in Frank Miller's 2008 adaptation of Will Eisner's comic creation The Spirit. Although the film was a failure upon theatrical release, the film and Macht himself both gained a cult following.

In July 2010, it was announced that Macht had signed on to star in the USA Network drama Suits, which was originally known under the working title A Legal Mind. The series ran for nine seasons and 134 episodes, Macht appearing in all. Macht began receiving co-producer credit during season 3.

Personal life
Macht married Australian-born actress Jacinda Barrett in 2004. The couple's first child, a girl, was born in August 2007 in Los Angeles. They had a second child, a son, in February 2014.

Macht has been the best friend of his Suits co-star Sarah Rafferty for over 28 years, ever since they met in 1993 at the Williamstown Theatre Festival. He was one of the guests at co-star Meghan Markle’s wedding to Prince Harry at St George's Chapel, Windsor Castle, in May 2018.

Macht is a vegetarian and practices green living.

Filmography

Film

Television

References

External links 

 

1972 births
Male actors from California
Male actors from New York City
American male film actors
American male television actors
Carnegie Mellon University College of Fine Arts alumni
Jewish American male actors
Living people
20th-century American male actors
21st-century American male actors
People from the Bronx
American Ashkenazi Jews